Inyaptuk Golets is a peak in the North Baikal Highlands. Administratively it is part of Buryatia, Russian Federation.

Geography
It is located in the southern part of the highland area, to the north of the northern end of Lake Baikal, in Severo-Baykalsky District. River Chuya has its sources in the northern slopes of the mountain. 

Inyaptuk is a ‘’golets’’-type of mountain with a bald peak belonging to the Synnyr Massif, one of the subranges of the North Baikal Highlands mountain system.

See also
List of mountains in Russia

References

External links
View on the Inyaptuk mountain

South Siberian Mountains
Mountains of Buryatia
ru:Иняптук